Live by Request is a live CD released in 2003 by Kenny Rogers.  It documents an installment of A&E Network's Live by Request series.

Ray Waddell of Billboard gave the album a positive review, saying that it was "a fitting overview of a sturdy artist and still vibrant career." A review by Michael D. Clark of the Houston Chronicle was less positive, praising the song choices but criticizing the "decision not to omit most of the between-song TV chatter", ultimately rating the album a "C−".

Track listing

 Welcome – "Islands in the Stream" – 3:08
 Official Welcome – Request
 "Daytime Friends" – 2:57
 Request
 "She Believes in Me" – 4:16
 Request
 "Ruby, Don't Take Your Love to Town" – 2:22
 Request
 "Love Will Turn You Around" – 3:09
 Request
 "The Greatest" – 2:45
 Request
 "Love or Something Like It" – 2:53
 Request
 "Through the Years" – 2:06
 Request
 "Lucille" – 3:47
 Request
 "Don't Fall in Love with a Dreamer" – 3:53
 Request
 "Coward of the County" – 2:35
 Request
 "Lady" – 3:44
 Request
 "Crazy" – 3:24
 Request
 "The Gambler" – 3:20
 Request
 "You Decorated My Life" – 3:29
 Closing – Intro to Finale
 "Slow Dance More" – 2:58

Charts
The album entered the Billboard Top Country Albums chart and peaked at number 68.

References

Kenny Rogers albums
2003 live albums